OpenX Software Ltd. is a programmatic advertising technology company founded in 2008. It has raised over $75 million from Accel, Index, Samsung, Dentsu, Mangrove Capital and others.

Background 
OpenX has offices in Pasadena (HQ), New York, Tokyo, London, and Kraków.

In September 2017, OpenX acquired two publisher tools, Mezzobit and PubNation.

After laying off "around 100 employees" in December 2018, the following month OpenX announced plans to move all on-premises workloads fully into the Google Cloud Platform by Q2 2019.

In May 2019, OpenX launched OpenAudience, a planning and targeting tool based on LiveRamp and Tapad data.

In January 2020, OpenX announced that CEO and co-founder Tim Cadogan was leaving to become the CEO of GoFundMe and that President John Gentry would step into the CEO role. This was followed in April by another round of layoffs where 15% of the company was affected.

In December 2021, the Federal Trade Commission announced that OpenX would pay a $2 million fine "to settle allegations that the company violated federal children's privacy law." Originally, the fine was to be $7.5 million but it was reduced "due to the company's inability to pay."

References

External links 
OpenX Website

Online advertising
Digital marketing companies of the United States
Marketing companies established in 2008
Online advertising services and affiliate networks